Taphrina is a fungal genus within the Ascomycota that causes leaf and catkin curl diseases and witch's brooms of certain flowering plants. One of the more commonly observed species causes peach leaf curl. Taphrina typically grow as yeasts during one phase of their life cycles, then infect plant tissues in which typical hyphae are formed, and ultimately they form a naked layer of asci on the deformed, often brightly pigmented surfaces of their hosts. No discrete fruit body is formed outside of the gall-like or blister-like tissues of the hosts. The asci form a layer lacking paraphyses, and they lack croziers. The ascospores frequently bud into multiple yeast cells within the asci. Phylogenetically, Taphrina is a member of a basal group within the Ascomycota, and type genus for the subphylum Taphrinomycotina, the class Taphrinomycetes, and order Taphrinales.

Species

 Taphrina alni (Berk. & Broome) Gjaerum
 Taphrina aurea (Pers.) Fr.
 Taphrina betulina Rostr.
 Taphrina bullata (Berkeley) Tulasne
 Taphrina caerulescens (Desmaz. & Mont.) Tul.
 Taphrina coryli
 Taphrina deformans (Berk.) Tul.
 Taphrina entomospora Thaxter
 Taphrina faulliana Mix
 Taphrina filicina Rostr.
 Taphrina hiratsukae Nishida
 Taphrina johansonii Sadebeck
 Taphrina maculans Butler
 Taphrina padi (Jacz.) Mix
 Taphrina piri
 Taphrina polystichi Mix
 Taphrina populina (Fr. ex Fr.) Fr.
 Taphrina potentillae (Farl.) Johans.
 Taphrina pruni Tul.
 Taphrina sadebeckii Johans.
 Taphrina tosquinetii (WestendD.) Magnus
 Taphrina ulmi (Fuckel) Johans.
 Taphrina wiesneri (Rathay) Mix

Footnotes

References
Broad leaf plant diseases in Canada (BC)- leaf spot example of Taphrina
Biology of fungi - microphoto of Taphrina
Witches Broom image
Palaeos "Introduction to the Ascomycota"
The Oregon Coalition of Interdisciplinary Databases: "Archiascomycetes: Early Diverging Ascomycetes"

Taphrinomycetes
Ascomycota genera
Taxa named by Elias Magnus Fries
Taxa described in 1815